Bengal Provincial Chatkal Mazdoor Union is a trade union of jute mill workers in West Bengal, India. The union is affiliated to the United Trade Union Congress.

Trade unions in India
Trade unions of the West Bengal jute mills
Jute industry trade unions
Organizations with year of establishment missing